The Air Transport Auxiliary (ATA) was a British civilian organisation set up at the start of the Second World War with headquarters at White Waltham Airfield in Berkshire. The ATA ferried new, repaired and damaged military aircraft between factories, assembly plants, transatlantic delivery points, maintenance units (MUs), scrapyards, and active service squadrons and airfields, but not to naval aircraft carriers. It also flew service personnel on urgent duty from one place to another and performed some air ambulance work. Notably, around 10% of its pilots were women, and from 1943 they received equal pay to their male colleagues, a first for the British government.

Mission
The initial plan was that the ATA would carry personnel, mail and medical supplies, but the pilots were immediately needed to work with the Royal Air Force (RAF) ferry pools transporting aircraft. By 1 May 1940 the ATA had taken over transporting all military aircraft from factories to maintenance units to have guns and accessories installed. On 1 August 1941 the ATA took over all ferrying jobs. This freed the much-needed combat pilots for combat duty. At one time there were fourteen ATA ferry pools as far apart as Hamble, near Southampton, and Lossiemouth, near Inverness in Scotland.

A special ATA Air Pageant was held at White Waltham on 29 September 1945 to raise money for the ATA Benevolent Fund, supported by the aircraft companies that had been served by the ATA. It included comprehensive static displays of Allied and German aircraft, including a V1, aero engines, and an AA gun and searchlight complete with crew. Pilots taking part included Alex Henshaw in a Supermarine Seafire.

Lord Beaverbrook, a World War II Minister of Aircraft Production, gave an appropriate tribute at the closing ceremony disbanding the ATA at White Waltham on 30 November 1945:

Accomplishment

During the war the ATA flew 415,000 hours and delivered more than 309,000  aircraft of 147 types, including Spitfires, Hawker Hurricanes, de Havilland Mosquitoes, North American Mustangs, Avro Lancasters, Handley Page Halifaxes, Fairey Swordfish, Fairey Barracudas and Boeing Fortresses. The average aircraft strength of the ATA training schools was 78. A total of 133,247 hours were flown by school aircraft and 6,013 conversion courses were put through. The total flying hours of the Air Movement Flight were 17,059, of which 8,570 were on domestic flights and 8,489 on overseas flights. About 883 tons of freight were carried and 3,430 passengers were transported without any casualties; but a total of 174 pilots, women as well as men, were killed flying for the ATA in the wartime years. Total taxi hours amounted to 179,325, excluding Air Movements.

As non-operational delivery flights, the aircraft guns were not loaded. After an encounter with German fighters in UK airspace, the mid-upper gun turrets of Avro Anson transports were armed. However, it was realised that this was against international law as the ATA staff were technically civilian status. A number of solutions were considered but eventually the gunners were withdrawn.

Administration
The administration of the ATA fell to Gerard d'Erlanger, a director of British Airways Ltd. He had suggested an organisation along the lines of the ATA in a letter dated 24 May 1938. Initially the Air Ministry was lukewarm to the idea but, with war imminent, they accepted d'Erlanger's proposal and the ATA was set up in 1939.

In late August 1939 the ATA was placed under British Airways Ltd for initial administration and finance, but on 10 October 1939 Air Member for Supply and Organisation (AMSO) took over. The first pilots were assigned to RAF Reserve Command and attached to RAF flights to ferry trainers, fighters and bombers from factory and storage to Royal Air Force stations. The ATA's Central Ferry Control, which allocated the required flights to all Ferry Pools, was based at RAF Andover.

Late in 1939 it was decided that a third and entirely civilian ferry pool should be set up at White Waltham, near Maidenhead in Berkshire. The operations of this pool began on 15 February 1940. On 16 May 1940 RAF Maintenance Command took control through its No. 41 Group. Then, on 22 July 1941, the ATA was placed under the control of Lord Beaverbrook's Ministry of Aircraft Production (MAP). Although control shifted between organisations, administration was carried out throughout the war by staff led by Commodore Gerard d’Erlanger, first at British Airways Ltd then, after its merger in 1940, at the British Overseas Airways Corporation (BOAC).

Pilots and Engineers

The ATA recruited pilots who were considered unsuitable for either the Royal Air Force or the Fleet Air Arm by reason of age, fitness or gender. A unique feature of the ATA was that physical disabilities were ignored if the pilot could do the job – thus, there were one-armed, one-legged, short-sighted and one-eyed pilots, humorously referred to as "Ancient and Tattered Airmen" (ATA).

The ATA also took pilots from other countries, both neutral and combatant. Representatives of 28 countries flew with the ATA.

Women pilots 
Most notably, the ATA allowed women pilots to ferry aircraft. The female pilots (nicknamed "Attagirls") had a high profile in the press. On 14 November 1939 Commander Pauline Gower was given the task of organising the women's section of the ATA. The first eight women pilots were accepted into service as No 5 Ferry Pilots Pool on 1 January 1940, initially only cleared to fly de Havilland Tiger Moth biplanes from their base in Hatfield. They were: Joan Hughes, Margaret Cunnison, Mona Friedlander, Rosemary Rees, Marion Wilberforce, Margaret Fairweather, Gabrielle Patterson, and Winifred Crossley Fair. 

Overall during World War II there were 166 women pilots, one in eight of all ATA pilots, and they volunteered from Britain, Canada, Australia, New Zealand, South Africa, the United States, the Netherlands and Poland. British women pilots included Mary de Bunsen and Diana Barnato Walker. Annette Elizabeth Mahon was the only Irish woman to serve in the ATA. From Argentina and Chile came Maureen Dunlop and Margot Duhalde and Vera Strodl Dowling from Denmark. 

Fifteen of these women lost their lives in the air, including the British pioneer aviator Amy Johnson, Margaret Fairweather, Joy Davison, Jane Winstone and Susan Slade. Two of the women pilots received commendations; one was Helen Kerly.

A notable American member of the ATA was the aviatrix Jacqueline Cochran, who returned to the United States and started a similar all female organization known as the Women Airforce Service Pilots (WASP).

In June 1940 the role of No 5 Ferry Pilots Pool was expanded to other non-combat types of aircraft (trainers and transports) such as the de Havilland Dominie, Airspeed Oxford, Miles Magister and Miles Master; eventually women were incorporated in the other (previously all-male) ferry pools and were permitted to fly virtually every type flown by the RAF and the Fleet Air Arm, including the four-engined heavy bombers, but excluding the largest flying boats. Hurricanes were first flown by women pilots on 19 July 1941, and Spitfires in August 1941.

One notable feature of the ATA was that women received the same pay as men of equal rank, starting in 1943. This was the first time that the British government had agreed to equal pay for equal work within an organisation under its control. At the same time American women flying with the Women Airforce Service Pilots (WASP) were receiving as little as 65 per cent of the pay of their male colleagues.

With the death in December 2020 of Eleanor Wadsworth at the age of 103, and of Jaye Edwards (née Stella Joyce Petersen) in August 2022 only one female former ATA pilot survives, American Nancy Stratford (co-author of Contact! Britain!: A woman ferry pilot's story during WWII in England). Wadsworth had joined the ATA in 1943 and went on to fly a total of 22 different aircraft types and flew Spitfires on 132 occasions. Edwards served as Third Officer in the ATA from 1943-1945.

Engineers 

As the ATA became established and expanded the size and number of aircraft variants, the need for having a variety of engineers quickly became apparent.  Further, as they began delivering larger multi-engine aircraft, the Flight Engineer (F/E) became essential in assisting the pilots.  They were also presented with their own unique insignia in both stitched and bullion variations.

There were many specific categories and levels of Engineers within the ATA organisation including Flight, Ground, SCE, Records Clerk, Tarmac, etc.  Of the approximately 30 Operational Flight Engineers, only a handful were women.  One of these was Patricia Parker who started her career with the ATA as a Pilot, third class but went on to become a F/E.  Others were Janice Harrington (died in service), Phillis Pierce and Alice Thomas, the latter who also started as a pilot with the ATA.

Training
The first ATA pilots were introduced to military aircraft at the RAF's Central Flying School (CFS), but the ATA soon developed its own training programme. Pilots progressed from light single-engined aircraft to more powerful and complex aircraft in stages. They first qualified on "Class 1" single-engined aircraft such as the Tiger Moth, Magister and Percival Proctor, then gained experience by doing ferrying work with any aircraft in that class, before returning to training to qualify and gain experience on the Class 2 advanced single-engined aircraft. The same process was followed to progress to Class 3 light twin-engined aircraft and Class 4 advanced twin-engined aircraft.

In each case, once cleared to fly one class of aircraft, pilots could be asked to ferry any plane in that class even if they had never seen that type of aircraft before. To do so they had ATA Pilots Notes, a two-ring book of small cards with the critical statistics and notations necessary to ferry each aircraft.

To fly Class 5 four-engined aircraft, pilots were first trained on the Handley Page Halifax heavy bomber and then could be permitted by their Commanding Officer to fly other similar types such as the Avro Lancaster when they had acquired more experience.  When flying Class 5 aircraft and certain Class 4 aircraft, the pilot was the sole pilot but was always accompanied by a further crew member such as a flight engineer. There were further rules for Class 6 flying boat ferrying.

The ATA trained its pilots only to ferry planes, rather than to achieve perfection on every type. For example, aerobatics and blind flying were not taught, and pilots were explicitly forbidden to do either, even if they were capable of doing so. Also, in order not to strain the engines, an "ATA cruise" speed was specified in the ATA Pilots Notes. The objective of the ATA was to deliver aircraft safely and that meant taking no unnecessary risks.

Ranks

ATA rank insignia was worn on the shoulder strap of the uniform jacket.

Units
The following units were active in the ATA:
 No. 1 Ferry Pool ATA White Waltham, MaidenheadPreviously: No. 1 Ferry Pilot Pool ATA − 'A' Section of No. 3 Ferry Pilot Pool ATA
 No. 2 Ferry Pool ATA Whitchurch, BristolPreviously: No. 2 Ferry Pilot Pool ATA − 'B' Section of No. 3 Ferry Pilot Pool ATA
 No. 3 Ferry Pool ATA Hawarden, ChesterPreviously: No. 3 Ferry Pilot Pool ATA − 'C' Section of No. 3 Ferry Pilot Pool ATA
 No. 4 Ferry Pool ATA Prestwick, AyrshirePreviously: No. 4 Ferry Pilot Pool ATA
 No. 5 Ferry Pool ATA Thame, Oxfordshire (Training Unit)
 Previously: No. 5 Ferry Pilot Pool ATA − 'D' Section of No. 3 Ferry Pilot Pool ATA − Women's Ferry Pilot Pool ATA
 No. 6 Ferry Pool ATA Ratcliffe, Leicester
 Previously: No. 6 Ferry Pilot Pool ATA
 No. 7 Ferry Pool ATA Sherburn-in-Elmet, Leeds
 Previously: No. 7 Ferry Pilot Pool ATA
 No. 8 Ferry Pool ATA Sydenham, Belfast
 Previously: No. 8 Ferry Pilot Pool ATA
 No. 9 Ferry Pool ATA Aston Down, Gloucestershire
 Previously: No. 9 Ferry Pilot Pool ATA
 No. 10 Ferry Pool ATA Lossiemouth, Moray
 Previously: No. 10 Ferry Pilot Pool ATA − No. 4 Ferry Pilot Pool ATA
 No. 12 Ferry Pool ATA Cosford, Shropshire
 Previously: No. 12 Ferry Pilot Pool ATA
 No. 15 Ferry Pool ATA Hamble, Southampton
 Previously: No. 15 Ferry Pilot Pool ATA
 No. 16 Ferry Pool ATA Kirkbride, Carlisle
 Previously: No. 16 Ferry Pilot Pool ATA − No. 4 Ferry Pilot Pool ATA
 No. 14 Ferry Pilot Pool ATA Ringway, Manchester
 Previously: No. 14 Ferry Pilot Pool ATA
 No. 5 (T) Ferry Pool ATA
 Previously: (Training) Ferry Pool ATA

 Initial Flying Training School ATA
 Previously: Elementary Flying Training School ATA − ATA School
 Air Movements Flight ATA (1942–45)
 Advanced Flying Training School ATA (1942–45)
 Previously: ATA School

Recognition

In 2008 the surviving members of the auxiliary were awarded Air Transport Auxiliary Veterans Badges in recognition for their contributions to the war effort. The badge was announced by Transport Secretary, Ruth Kelly in February 2008. Some of the awards were presented directly by Prime Minister Gordon Brown at a Downing Street reception in September 2008.

See also

Women Airforce Service Pilots

In media
Dewar, Isla. Izzy's War. Ebury Press, 2010.
Gould, Carol. Spitfire Girls: A Tale of the Lives and Loves Achievements and Heroism of the Women ATA Pilots in World War II. Forfar: Black Ace Books, 1998.
Lord Brown, Kate The Beauty Chorus. London: Corvus Atlantic, 2011
Matthews, Beryl. A Flight of Golden Wings. Sutton: Severn House, 2007.
Morrison, Margaret and Pamela Tulk-Hart, Paid to Be Safe. London: Hutchinson, 1948.
Ryan, Garry, Blackbirds (2012) and Two Blackbirds (2014). Calgary, AB: NeWest Press.
Schrader, Helena. The Lady in the Spitfire. Lincoln, Nebraska: iUniverse, Inc, 2006.
Singer, E. M. Mother Flies Hurricanes. Bend, OR: Avidia Cascade Press, 1999.
Terrell, George. I'll Never Leave You. San Jose: Writer's Showcase, 2001.
Wein, Elizabeth. Code Name Verity (Electric Monkey, 2012) and Rose Under Fire (2013)
Lester, Natasha. The Paris Secret. New York: Forever (Hachette Book Group), 2020.

References

Citations

Bibliography
Air Transport Auxiliary, Air Transport Auxiliary. (Handbook) White Waltham: Reminder Book, 1945.

Barnato Walker, Diana. Spreading My Wings. Patrick Stephens, 1994 
Curtis, Lettice. The Forgotten Pilots: A Story of the Air Transport Auxiliary, 1939-45. Olney, Bucks: Nelson & Saunders, 1985 
Schrader, Helena. Sisters in Arms. Barnsley: Pen & Sword Aviation, 2006.

Further reading
Bergel, Hugh. Fly and Deliver: A Ferry Pilot's Log Book. Shrewsbury: Airlife Publishing, 1982.
Curtis, Lettice. Lettice Curtis: Her Autobiography. Walton on Thames: Red Kite, 2004.
De Bunsen, Mary. Mount Up with Wings. London: Hutchinson, 1960.
Du Cros, Rosemary. ATA Girl: Memoirs of a Wartime Ferry Pilot. London: Muller, 1983.
Ellis, Mary. A Spitfire Girl. Barnsley: Frontline Books, 2016.
Fahie, Michael. A Harvest of Memories: The Life of Pauline Gower M.B.E.. Peterborough: GMS Enterprises, 1995.
Genovese, J. Gen. We Flew Without Guns. Philadelphia: The John C. Winston Company, 1945.
Hugh Bergel (ed). Flying Wartime Aircraft; ATA Ferry Pilots' Handling Notes for Seven World War II Aircraft. Newton Abbot: David & Charles, 1972. 
Hathaway, Warren. Pursuit of a Dream: The Story of Pilot Vera (Strodl) Dowling. Edmonton, Canada: PageMaster Publishing, 2012.
Hawkins, Regina Trice. Hazel Jane Raines, Pioneer Lady of Flight. Macon, GA: Mercer University Press, 1996.
Hyams, Jacky. The Female Few: Spitfire Heroines of the Air Transport Auxiliary. Gloucester: History Press, 2012. 
King, Alison. Golden Wings. London: C. Arthur Pearson Ltd, 1956.
Lucas, Y. M. WAAF with Wings. Peterborough: GMS Enterprises, 1992. 
Miller Livingston Stratford, Nancy and Wilde, Ann Contact! Britain!. Createspace, 2011. 
Moggridge, Dolores Theresa. Woman Pilot. London: Michael Joseph, 1957. Republished as: Moggridge, Jackie. Spitfire Girl. My Life in the Sky. London: Head of Zeus, 2014. 
Narracott, Arthur Henson. Unsung Heroes of the Air. London: F. Muller, 1943.
Phelps, Anthony. "I Couldn't Care Less.". Leicester: Harborough Pub. Co.; sole distributors to the trade: H. Marshall, 1945.
Taylor, Leonard. Airwomen's Work. London: Sir Isaac Pitman & Sons, 1943.
Thomas, Nick. Naomi the Aviatrix. Createspace, 2011. 

Walters, Anthony Jack. Air Transport Auxiliary (The Lost Child). Wallingford: Aries Publications, 2006. 
Welch, Ann Courtenay Edmonds. Happy to Fly: An Autobiography. London: John Murray, 1983. 
Wheeler, Jo. The Hurricane Girls: The Inspirational True Story of the Women who Dared to Fly. London: Penguin Books, 2018. 
Whittell, Giles. Spitfire Women of World War II. London: Harper Press, 2007.

Other books that mention the ATA's women pilots
Bell, Elizabeth S. Sisters of the Wind: Voices of Early Women Aviators. Pasadena, CA: Trilogy Books, 1994.
Jaros, Dean. Heroes Without Legacy: American Airwomen, 1912-1944. Niwot, CO: University Press of Colorado, 1993.
Keil, Sally Van Wagenen. Those Wonderful Women in Their Flying Machines: The Unknown Heroines of World War II. New York: Rawson, Wade Publishers, 1979.
Lomax, Judy. Women of the Air. New York: Dodd, Mead, 1987.

External links

Air Transport Auxiliary Association
Air Transport Auxiliary Museum & Online Archive at Maidenhead Heritage Centre
British Airways Museum Collection
Obituary of Ann Wood-Kelly
Royal Air Force history site Air Transport Auxiliary – Women with Wings
Royal Air Force history site Diana Barnato Walker
Royal Air Force history site Amy Johnson
Fleet Air Arm Archive Air Transport Auxiliary
Women in Military Aviation in World War II
Winged Auxiliaries: Women Pilots in the UK and US during World War II
Mother Flies Hurricanes
Those Magnificent Women. Times Online (19 November 2005)
Stanford Hoover Institution - Collections – Air Transport Auxiliary
Your Archives Air Transport Auxiliary
Hamble le Rice ATA Memorial
John Leonard Yingst papers at the Hoover Institution Archives
Ann Wood-Kelly papers at the Hoover Institution Archives
Jane Spencer collection at the Hoover Institution Archives

Online films
ATA Girl! Movie
Movie: Ferry Pilot
BBC Documentary: Spitfire Women

 
Air Ministry during World War II
Aviation organisations based in the United Kingdom
1940 establishments in the United Kingdom
1945 disestablishments in the United Kingdom
Organizations established in 1940
Organizations disestablished in 1945
Defunct organisations based in the United Kingdom